The Duel: A Story Where Truth Is Mere Detail is a Brazilian movie by Marcos Jorge, released on March 19, 2015 based on the book The Old Sailors or the Captain of the Long Course by the Brazilian writer Jorge Amado.

Plot
Based on Jorge Amado's book The Old Sailors or the Captain of the Long Course, the film tells the story of Commander Vasco Moscoso of Aragon (Joaquim de Almeida) and his hectic arrival at the village of Periperi, located near a large municipality. port. After a long life of adventures on the seas, now mature, this picturesque stranger comes to rest. The captain becomes a storyteller and gains sympathy from most of the locals, but some people are beginning to suspect his character, especially the village's Chico Pacheco and until then the most admired citizen of the place.

Cast
Joaquim de Almeida as Captain Vasco
José Wilker as Chico Pacheco
Tainá Müller as Dorothy
João Gabriel Vasconcellos as Lieutenant Mário
Cláudia Raia as Carol
Patricia Pillar as Clotilde
Milton Gonçalves as Governor
Marcio Garcia as Georges

References

2000s Portuguese-language films
Brazilian comedy films
2005 comedy films